The high school standardization policy was introduced in South Korea in order to reduce the gap between high schools in the region since 1974, and instead of selecting students from high schools in the region, the entire student population is divided into general schools in each district.

Background
The standardization policy was introduced in 1974 with the aim of preventing the excessive burden of learning among middle school students due to the increase in the number of students and the preparation of high school entrance exams, overheated competition to enter prestigious high schools and concentration of the population in urban areas. It is also known as a policy to improve problems caused by rote-based cramming and reduce the educational gap between high schools. It is also a follow-up to the middle school's non-exam admission system, which took effect in 1969.

Each region's standardization process and present condition
It was standardized in Seoul and Busan in 1974 and expanded to Daegu, Incheon and Gwangju in 1975. Daejeon, Jeonju, Masan, Cheongju, Suwon, Chuncheon, Jeju in 1979, Changwon, Seongnam, Cheonan, Gunsan, Iri (now Iksan) in 1980, the areas of Mokpo, Andong and Jinju were leveled. However, the standardization policy was abolished in Chuncheon, Wonju, Cheonan, Mokpo, Andong, Gunsan and Iri stations as the debate continued that the standardization policy was ineffective in small urban areas. However, in 2000, Ulsan Metropolitan City (Distribution), Gwacheon City (Pyeongchon), Anyang City (Pyeongchon), Gunpo City (Sanbon), Uiwang City, Bucheon City (Middle East), and Goyang City (Silsan) were leveled. Since then, Yeosu, Jeollanam-do, and Suncheon-si in 2005, Gimhae, Gyeongsangnam-do in 2006, and Pohang, Gyeongsangbuk-do in 2008 implemented high school standardization. In 2013, high school standardization was implemented in Gwangmyeong, Ansan, Uijeongbu and Gangneung, Gangwon Province. Chuncheon, Gangwon Province, Wonju, Gunsan, Iksan, Seongnam Province, and Mokpo, Jeollanam-do Province, have abolished and reintroduced the standardization system.

As of 2017, the government has adopted a high school equalization system in 36 regions across the country. Although the standardization system existed in the six metropolitan cities after the introduction of the standardization system, the Sejong Special Self-Governing City, where the central government administrative body was relocated, was introduced in 2017 as part of the resolution of non-preferred schools under the high school option system.

Korea High school standardization area
 Seoul Metropolitan Government: All Regions (1974)
 Busan Metropolitan City: Excluding Kijang-gun (1974)
 Daegu Metropolitan City: Excluding Dalseong-gun (1975)
 Gwangju Metropolitan City: All Regions (1975)
 Incheon Metropolitan City: All areas (1975) (High schools in Ganghwa-gun, Ongjin-gun, Jung-gu, Yeongjong-do, etc. are special district high schools, and therefore belong to non-standardization High School)
 Daejeon Metropolitan City: All Regions (1979)
 Ulsan Metropolitan City: All Regions (2000)
 Sejong Special Self-Governing City: All Regions (2017)
 Southern Gyeonggi Province: Suwon City (1979), Seongnam City (Sujeong-gu, Jungwon-gu (1980), Anyang City, Gwacheon City, Gunpo City, Uiwang City, Bucheon City,  Seongnam City (2002), Gwangmyeong City, Ansan City (This year 2013 - Daebu High School is a special district high school, which corresponds to a non-standardized high school.) (In 2015, Baekam High School is a special district high school, so it is a non-standardized high school),
 Northern Gyeonggi Province: Goyang City (2002) Uijeongbu City (2013)
 Gangwon Province: Wonju (1980-1991/2013), Chuncheon (1979-1991/2013), Gangneung (2013)
 Chungcheongbuk-do: Cheongju City (1979)
 Chungcheongnam-do: Cheonan City (1980-1995/2016)
 Jeollabuk-do: Gunsan City (1980-1990/2000), Iksan City (1980-1991/2000), Jeonju City (1979)
 Jeollanam-do: Mokpo City (1980-1990/2005), Yeosu City (2005), Suncheon City (2005)
 Gyeongsangbuk-do: Pohang City (2008)
 Gyeongsangnam-do: Gimhae City (2006), Masan City (currently Masan Hoewon-gu, Changwon City, Masan Happo-gu, Masan, 1879), Jinju City (1980), Changwon City (currently Seongsan-gu, Changwon City, Uichang-gu, 1980)
 Jeju Special Self-Governing Province: Jeju City (1979)

Areas where high school standardization policy is abolished
 Gyeongsangbuk-do: Andong (1980-1990)

Prestigious high school

Before high school standardization
In the metropolitan area, Gyeonggi, Seoul, Kyongbok, Yongsan and Gyeongdong high schools are the top five public high schools in Seoul. And the five most prestigious private schools are Choong-Ang High School, Hwimun High School, Bosung High School, Yangjeong High School, and Baejae High School. Some of the most prestigious female high schools are Gyeonggi Girls' High School and Changdeok Girls' High School in Gyeonggi Province, and Ewha Girls' High School, Sookmyung Women's High School and Mental Girls' High School in private schools. In non-capital areas, there were Busan High School in Busan, Gyeongnam High School in Daegu, Jemulpo High School in Incheon, Jeonju Junju, Gwangju Jeil High School and Daejeon High School in Daejeon.

After high school standardization
After high school standardization, Gyeonggi High School, which was formerly a prestigious high school, moved to Gangnam, and as a village of high-end apartments was formed in Gangnam, it was able to become a prestigious high school in the 8th class of Gangnam, although it was not up to its former reputation.

As the metropolis standardized. In the midst of the strength of the existing traditional areas, the newly established and prestigious areas also emerged. Suncheon and Pohang have stood out since their birth generations in the 1970s. Local elite high schools such as Suncheon High School and Pohang High School played the role of a tow truck. Entrance to a local prestigious school has become more difficult than entering a prestigious university. During the 2003 College Scholastic Ability Test, Seo Hyeon-go (351.5), Baekseok High School (349.4), Anyang High School (344.8), Gangneung High School (341.9), Bundang High School (336.5), Chuncheon High School (334.6), and Pohang High School (333.8) were among the highest in the nation. These schools have standardized.

Evaluation and controversy

Among the advantages of the high school standardization policy are the environment in which students can overcome the sense of prestige and discrimination based on their own schools, ease the burden of college entrance exams, and provide a full-fledged education.
Shortcoming points are the dumbing down of high school education, poor quality of education, loss of school tradition and lack of talent finding.
The high school standardization virtually guarantees equal educational opportunities guaranteed by the Constitution.
It is also claimed to be a social integration policy aimed at minimizing social discrimination due to education.
The achievements of the high school standardization policy have also shown a distinctly divided tendency according to the trends of the media.
The reasons for and against the high school standardization policy are outlined in the following table.

Although there are claims that the policy of equalization of high schools is responsible for the spread of private education, increased private education costs, and collapse of public education, the causal relationship is uncertain. Some suggested solutions to these problems special purpose high schools, self-reliant private high schools, the expansion of alternative schools, and the granting of autonomy to private schools. Some say that the current education problem is not caused by the policy of equalizing high schools, but rather by the fact that the policy of equalizing high schools has not been implemented properly. Some pointed out that it should be an education that emphasizes cooperation, not competition. The claim that the social class will become entrenched due to the standardization of high schools has also become controversial. On the contrary, some say that equalization dilutes the effect of investing in education costs for children of the wealthy as the function of selecting students shifts to the senior age. It will extend the opportunity for students in relatively poor conditions to make up for their academic deficits with their individual efforts.

Non-standardization high school

Non-standardization high school was founded after high school standardization. Non-standardization high schools like autonomous private high school, are exceptionally recognized for their non-standardization areas for reasons such as distance to school and facilities conditions. Non-standardization high school are usually located in urban and rural areas or areas where transportation is inconvenient such as Ongjin-gun in Incheon, Yeongjong-do and Ganghwa-do. Seo In-cheon High School and Daein High School in Incheon are not computer drawers but direct selection of school principals. Therefore, it was lifted to Non-standardization high school from 1996 and changed to standardization local late high school based on the calculation lottery system. In addition, Mirim Girls' High School and Wuxin High School received approval to cancel autonomous private high school in 2015 from the Seoul Metropolitan Office of Education due to a lack of student recruitment and school management. It then switched to Standardization Late High School in 2016. However, in 2012 and 2013, Dongyang High School and Yongmun High School did not meet the quota of new students, so standardization local high school. Non-standardization high school, various conditions are not good. Meanwhile, education content and methods, support of the Board of Education are the same as in standardization high schools.

Incidents of high school standardization policy

Incidents of High school standardization policy is an important example of the Republic of Korea's Constitution on the confirmation of unconstitutional Article 84 of the Enforcement Decree of the Elementary and Secondary Education Act.

Fact relevance
The claimant is a parent with a high school student and a middle school student who is scheduled to go to high school.
The petitioner filed for a Constitutional Court ruling, claiming that it violates parents' right to choose schools, religious education and the right to pursue happiness.
This is because Article 84 of the Enforcement Decree of the Elementary and Secondary Education Act, which stipulates the allocation of high school lottery, can be assigned to schools that block opportunities for the claimant's children to apply to schools of their choice and provide unwanted schools or religious education.

Conclusion
Constitutional, judge 6:3 opinion of the judge

Reason
Under Article 31 of the Constitution, the state has a wide-ranging right to form concerning school education, including the institution, organization, school type, educational objectives, content and methods of classes. Article 84 of the Enforcement Decree of the Elementary and Secondary Education Act will normalize middle school education by addressing overheated competition in high schools. Also, the purpose of legislation is justified as it is for equalization of high school education opportunities through reduction of school-to-school gaps and regional gaps. 
In addition, it is recognized that the method of admission by the superintendent, not the method of competition for admission by each school, and the method of allocation by lottery by school group is appropriate.

Similar cases outside of Korea
Public schools in the United States, UK, and France are unique by region as students are assigned based on their residence, but the autonomy of educational councils in each school district is guaranteed. In addition, professional public schools are separately supported by the independent education tax of local residents, and are implementing regional education differentiation. Most private schools are known to be free to select students. In the UK, starting in 2008, admissions to prestigious public high schools have been announced to have a raffle system, rather than a residence priority.

In the case of Finland, schools can be supported regardless of where they live.
Highly competitive public high schools have students' grades as the criterion for selection.

Japan has been standardized since 1968. But starting with Tokyo in 2003, a growing number of municipalities have abolished standardization. U-Tori education, which was conducted from 2002, was once considered positive for the curriculum. Currently, it is not implemented due to a decrease in basic education.

The U.S. No Child Left Behind Act is an education law that calls for improvement in schools where students' "improvement of their grades" falls short of standards through annual evaluations. In the UK, the evaluation grades of schools (League tables) are announced each year. The lack of high school principals was also a problem due to excessive work compared to authority. Some examples are the U.S. Child Left Behind and the U.K.'s school director responsibility system, which emphasizes school responsibilities for providing quality education.

List of late high school in standardization area of South Korea

Capital Region

Seoul

Incheon

Gyeonggi Province

The Southeast Region

Busan

Daegu–Gyeongbuk

Daegu

Hoseo

Daejeon

Sejong City

References

Education in South Korea